The twelfth edition of the men's football tournament at the Pan American Games was held in Mar del Plata, Argentina from March 10 to March 24, 1995. Twelve teams competed, with title defender USA being eliminated in the first round. After the preliminary round there was a knock-out stage.

All the matches were held in Estadio José María Minella.
 Argentina, coached by Daniel Passarella, won their fifth gold medal after beating Mexico on penalties in the final match.

Group stage

Group A

Group B

Group C

Knockout stage

Quarter finals

Semi finals

Bronze medal match

Gold Medal match

Award

Medalists

Goalscorers

References

1995 in CONCACAF football
Football
1995
1995
1995 in American soccer
1995 in South American football
1994–95 in Mexican football
1994–95 in Argentine football